A Raisin in the Sun is a play by Lorraine Hansberry that debuted on Broadway in 1959.

A Raisin in the Sun may also refer to:
 "A raisin in the sun", a line fragment from the 1951 poem suite Montage of a Dream Deferred by Langston Hughes
 A Raisin in the Sun (1961 film), a theatrical film starring Sidney Poitier
 Raisin (musical), a 1973 musical theater adaptation of the Lorraine Hansberry play
 A Raisin in the Sun (2008 film), a television film starring Sean Combs and Phylicia Rashad